Baron St John may refer to several different peerage titles:

Peerage of England

Baron St John of Lageham
Created 1299 and dormant since 1353 (Lagham Manor, Surrey)
John St. John, 1st Baron St. John of Lageham (d. 27 Jun 1316) m. Beatrix (Broy?)(St. John) Gyse
John St. John, 2nd Baron St. John of Lageham (d. 16 Jun 1322) m. Margery Gyse
John St. John, 3rd Baron St. John of Lageham (b. calculated 1309) m. Katherine de Say
Roger St. John, 4th Baron St. John of Lageham (d. 28 Mar 1353); died without issue. The Barony became dormant and the manor of Lageham passed to descendants of his brothers.

Baron St John of Basing

Created 1299 and abeyant since 1429

Baron St John
Created 1539 and merged since 1551 with the Marquessate of Winchester

Baron St John of Bletso

Created 1559
Oliver St John, 1st Baron St John of Bletso (d. 1582)
John St John, 2nd Baron St John of Bletso (d. 1596)
Oliver St John, 3rd Baron St John of Bletso (c. 1540–1618)
Oliver St John, 1st Earl of Bolingbroke (4th Baron St John of Bletso) (d. 1646) (created Earl of Bolingbroke in 1624)

Peerage of Great Britain
 Baron St John of Lydiard Tregoze, created 1712, as a subsidiary title of the Viscountcy of Bolingbroke
 Baron St John of Battersea, created 1716 as a subsidiary title of the Viscountcy of St John

Peerage of the United Kingdom
 Baron St John of Fawsley, life peerage 1987–2012

St John
St John
Saint John of Lageham